Jack Hutchinson (March 19, 1932 - January 12, 2003) was a Canadian football player. Hutchinson played for the BC Lions. Saskatchewan Roughriders and Winnipeg Blue Bombers. He played junior football for the Saskatoon Hilltops and at the University of British Columbia.

References

1932 births
BC Lions players
Saskatchewan Roughriders players
Winnipeg Blue Bombers players
Canadian football fullbacks
Players of Canadian football from Ontario
Canadian football people from Toronto
UBC Thunderbirds football players
2003 deaths